Handball Club Kehra is an Estonian handball team from Kehra. Their home matches are played at the Kehra Spordihoone. They compete in Meistriliiga.

Accomplishments

Baltic Handball League: 
Winners (2) : 2011, 2012
Meistriliiga: 
Winners (11) : 1993, 1994, 1995, 1996, 1999, 2003, 2004, 2006, 2009, 2012, 2014
Runner-Up (8) : 1997, 1998, 2000, 2005, 2008, 2011, 2013, 2015

Team

Current squad 

Squad for the 2022–23 season 

Goalkeepers
 Siim Normak
 Hannes Hapsalo 
Wingers
RW
  Alvar Soikka
LW 
  Karl Kõverik
  Tanel Vilks
  Sigmar Seermann
Line players 
  Anton Barouski
  Maksim Tanner McCauley
  Mihkel Parm

Back players
LB
  David Mamporia 
  Oskar Luks
  Rasmus Eensaar
CB 
  Dmitro Yankovskyi
  Sergio-Silver Kreegimaa
RB
  Indrek Normak
  Kristofer Liedemann

References

External links

HC Kehra at eurohandball.com

Estonian handball clubs
Anija Parish
1991 establishments in Estonia
Handball clubs established in 1991